John L. Wood (born December 4, 1961) is a Robert A. Welch Distinguished Professor of Chemistry and Biochemistry;
Cancer Prevention Research Institute of Texas Scholar; and
Associate Editor for the Americas, Tetrahedron Letters at
Baylor University.

Wood received a B.A. degree from the University of Colorado in 1985 and a Ph.D. from the University of Pennsylvania in 1991. He then moved to Harvard University as an American Cancer Society postdoctoral fellow and continued studying natural products synthesis in the laboratories of Stuart Schreiber. He joined the faculty at Yale University in 1993 as an assistant professor and was promoted to full professor in 1998. In 2006, he joined the faculty at Colorado State University as the Albert I. Meyers Professor of Chemistry.

Awards and honors 

Katritzky Award in Heterocyclic Chemistry (ISHC) 2009
3éme Cycle Lectureship, University of Basel 2009
Distinguished Behringer Simon Lecturer, ETH Zurich 2009
Amgen Faculty Award 2005, 2006, 2007, 2008, 2009
Japanese Society for the Promotion of Science Fellow 2008
American Chemical Society Arthur C. Cope Scholar Award, 2004
Yamanouchi USA Faculty Award 1998, 1999, 2000, 2001, 2002, 2003
Merck Faculty Award 2000, 2001, 2002
Kitasato Microbial Chemistry Medal 2001
Bristol-Myers Squibb Foundation Research Award 1998–2001
Pfizer Research Award 1997–2001
Zeneca Excellence in Chemistry Award 1998
Dreyfus Teacher Scholar Award 1998
Novartis Chemistry Lectureship 1997–1998
Alfred P. Sloan Foundation Fellow 1997
Parke-Davis Distinguished Michigan Lecturer 1997
Bristol-Myers Squibb Research Award 1997
Glaxo-Wellcome Young Chemistry Scholar Award 1996–1998
Eli Lilly Young Faculty Award 1996–1997
NSF CAREER award 1996–2000
Yale University, Junior Faculty Fellowship, 1996–1997
American Cancer Society, Junior Faculty Award 1994
Camille and Henry Dreyfus New Faculty Award 1993
American Cancer Society Postdoctoral Fellowship 1991–1993
National Institutes of Health Postdoctoral Fellowship 1991–1993 (declined)
University of Pennsylvania Dean's Dissertation Fellowship 1989–1990
Distinguished Organic Chemistry Teaching Award 1986

References

External links 
 John's research group at Baylor University

Baylor University faculty
1964 births
Living people
21st-century American biochemists